Pasiphilodes rufogrisea is a moth in the family Geometridae. It is found on Borneo.

The forewings are brownish grey, with black and brown fasciation and a paler ochreous grey band.

References

Moths described in 1976
Eupitheciini